The 2012 Limerick Senior Hurling Championship was the 118th staging of the Limerick Senior Hurling Championship since its establishment by the Limerick County Board.

Na Piarsaigh were the defending champions.

On 7 October 2012, Kilmallock won the championship after a 1-15 to 0-15 defeat of Adare in the final. It was their ninth championship title overall and their first title in two championship seasons.

Results

Final

References

Limerick Senior Hurling Championship
Limerick Senior Hurling Championship